Jesse Teat (born 1979) is an alpine skier from New Zealand.

In the 2002 Winter Olympics at Salt Lake City he came 50th in the Giant Slalom.

References

External links  
 
 

Living people
1979 births
New Zealand male alpine skiers
Olympic alpine skiers of New Zealand
Alpine skiers at the 2002 Winter Olympics